Grand vizier was the title of the effective head of government of many sovereign states in the Islamic world. The office of Grand Vizier has its origin in the Wuzurg Framadār,  the highest ranking official of the Sasanian state. After Islam, it was first held by officials in the later Abbasid Caliphate. It was then held in the Ottoman Empire, the Mughal Empire, the Sokoto Caliphate the Safavid Empire and Morocco. In the Ottoman Empire, the Grand Vizier held the imperial seal and could convene all other viziers to attend to affairs of the state; the viziers in conference were called "Kubbealtı viziers" in reference to their meeting place, the Kubbealtı ('under the dome') in Topkapı Palace. His offices were located at the Sublime Porte. Today, the Prime Minister of Pakistan is referred to in Urdu as Wazir-e-azam, which translates literally to Grand Vizier.

Initially, the Grand Viziers were exclusively of Turk origin in the Ottoman Empire. However, after there were troubles between the Turkish Grand Vizier Çandarlı Halil Pasha the Younger and Sultan Mehmed II (who had him executed), there was a rise of slave administrators (devshirme). These were much easier for the sultans to control, as compared to the free administrators of Turkish aristocratic origin.

Examples

Ottoman Empire

The term vizier was originally used in the Abbasid Caliphate in the 8th century AD. This position was later adopted by the Ottomans in the early 14th century, by the Seljuks of Anatolia. During the nascent phases of the Ottoman state, "vizier" was the only title used. The first of these Ottoman viziers who was titled "Grand Vizier" (French spelling: grand-vézir) was Çandarlı Halil Pasha the Elder. The purpose in instituting the title "Grand Vizier" was to distinguish the holder of the sultan's seal from other viziers. The initially more frequently used title of vezir-ı a’zam was gradually replaced by another one, sadr-ı a’zam ( from Arabic  "front part, bosom, forehead, lead, forefront" and  "superior, major, maximal, paramount, grand", informally pronounced sadrazam), both meaning "grand vizier" in practice. Throughout the Ottoman history, the Grand Viziers have also been termed sadr-ı âlî ("sublime vizier"), vekil-ı mutlak ("absolute attorney"), sâhib-ı devlet ("holder of the State"), serdar-ı ekrem ("most noble [commander-in-]chief"), serdar-ı a’zam ("grand [commander-in-]chief") and zât-ı âsafî ("vizieral person").

Halil Pasha the Elder reformed the role of the vizier in several ways. Several viziers before him held an equivalent, but differently named office; he was the first who held the position of "Grand Vizier", during the reign of Murad I. He was the first advisor with a military background – his forerunners had come from a more scholarly class of men. It is also significant that he was the first of a political family that, at the time, rivaled the Ottoman dynasty itself. Several of Çandarlı Halil Pasha the Elder's kin went on to hold the office of Grand Vizier in the decades following his death.

Çandarlı Halil Pasha the Younger, the grandson of Pasha the Elder, was also highly influential in shaping the role of the Grand Vizier. During the reign of Mehmed II, the Younger opposed the siege of Constantinople and the ongoing hostilities with Christians. Two days after the siege was won by Mehmed II, the Younger was executed for his opposition. After his death, the position of Grand Vizier was chosen nearly exclusively from the kul system. Often, the men who were chosen had a Byzantine or Balkan background. According to Gábor, this was usually a political move, designed to appease powerful European factions to Ottoman supremacy. In fact, it was easier for the sultan to control an enslaved and non-Turk administrator. In the Ottoman Empire, executing a Grand Vizier of Turkish origin (in the event they were rebellious) and an enslaved foreigner would also give rise to different reactions. Further, the devshirme were less subject to influence from court factions. From the very beginning, the Turcoman were a danger that undermined the Sultan's creation of a strong state. 

Grand Viziers gained immense political supremacy in the later days of the Ottoman Empire. Power was centralized in the position of the Grand Vizier during the Köprülü era. Köprülü Mehmed Pasha was a powerful political figure during the reign of Mehmed IV, and was appointed to the office of Grand Vizier in 1656. He consolidated power within the position and sent the Sultan away from the city on hunting trips, thus stopping Mehmed's direct management over the state. Next, he forcibly removed any officers suspected of corruption; those who did not leave were executed. He also conducted campaigns against Venice and the Habsburgs, as well as quelling rebellions in Anatolia. On his deathbed five years later, he convinced Mehmed to appoint his son (Köprülü Fazıl Ahmed Pasha) as the next Grand Vizier, thus securing his dynasty a position of supreme power in the Empire. It was during the Köprülü era that the Ottoman Empire reached its largest geographic expansion across Europe, Asia Minor, and Africa.

In Ottoman legal theory, the Sultan was supposed to conduct affairs of state exclusively via the Grand Vizier, but in reality, this arrangement was often circumvented. As the Ottomanist Colin Imber writes, the sultan "had closer contact with the pages of the privy chamber, the kapi agha, the kizlar agha or with other courtiers than he did with the Grand Vizier, and these too could petition the sultan on their own or somebody else’s behalf. He might, too, be more inclined to take the advice of his mother, a concubine, or the head gardener at the helm of the royal barge, than of the Grand Vizier".

After the Tanzimat period of the Ottoman Empire in the 19th century, the Grand Viziers came to assume a role more like that of the prime ministers of contemporary Western monarchies.

Forty nine Grand Viziers of Albanian ethnicity served the empire during the Ottoman period and most of them were southern Albanians (Tosks).

Mughal Empire

Bairam Khan was the Grand Vizier of the Mughal Empire, who led the forces of Akbar to victory during the Second Battle of Panipat.

Abu'l-Fazl ibn Mubarak, Grand Vizier of the Mughal Empire during the reign of Akbar.

Saadullah Khan, Grand Vizier of the Mughal Empire during the reign of Shah Jahan made the biggest contribution to the organization and administration of the Mughal Empire, he is considered the best of the long line of Mughal Grand Viziers.

During the reign of Aurangzeb, Ali Quli Khan was bestowed this title.

Later general Zulfiqar Khan Nusrat Jung became Grand Vizier, his fame as one of the most greatest military leaders in the Mughal Empire would lead to his downfall when rogue generals executed him in a power struggle after the death of Aurangzeb.

In 1718, Balaji Vishwanath, leader of the antagonistic Maratha Confederacy, secured the right to collect Chauth and Sardeshmukhi from the Subahs of the Mughal Empire by the rogue Vizier Syed Hassan Ali Khan Barha, whose grip over the Deccan had substantially weakened. Asaf Jah I, however, refused to grant Chauth to the Maratha Confederacy during its onset in 1718 and in 1721, after the nobility of the Mughal Empire had the two Sayyid Brothers assassinated. However, the Marathas had already expanded up to the Narmada River, and entrenched themselves in that region thereafter. Baji Rao I later instigated war by collecting Chauth in 1723, and trying to expand Maratha rule in the Deccan and beyond, causing the outbreak of the Later Mughal-Maratha Wars.

Qamaruddin Khan was handpicked to be the Grand Vizier of the Mughal Empire, by Asaf Jah I. He successfully repelled Baji Rao I during the Battle of Delhi (1737), and negotiated peace after the occupation of the Mughal Empire by the forces of Nader Shah. He fell in battle after being struck by a stray artillery shell, by Afghan marauders in the year 1749.

After defeating Ahmad Shah Durrani, the new Mughal emperor, Ahmad Shah Bahadur, posted Safdarjung, Nawab of Oudh as Mughal Grand Vizier, Feroze Jung III as Mir Bakshi and Muin ul-Mulk (Mir Mannu), the son of late Grand Vizier Qamaruddin Khan, as the governor of Punjab

Safdarjung's efforts to defend the reign of Ahmad Shah Bahadur from treacherous subjects failed.

Shuja-ud-Daula served as the leading Grand Vizier of the Mughal Empire during the Third Battle of Panipat. He was also the Nawab of Awadh, and a loyal ally of Shah Alam II.

Notable fictional grand viziers
Ahoshta Tarkaan (The Horse and His Boy)
Iznogoud (comic series)
Zig Zag (The Thief and the Cobbler)
Jafar (Aladdin)
Mas Amedda (Star Wars)
Zurvan (Prince of Persia: The Sands of Time/The Two Thrones)
Vizier Alemshah (Kuruluş: Osman)
Rude Ralph (Grand Vizier of Lord High Emperor of the Universe Horrid Henry)
Barbudo Grande (Grand Vizier of the Imperial Corsairs Elite Dangerous)

See also
List of Grand Viziers of Persia
List of Mughal Grand Viziers
List of Ottoman Grand Viziers
List of Safavid Grand Viziers
Sokoto Grand Vizier
Wuzurg framadar

Notes

References

Sources